Surinamese Maroons (also Marrons, Businenge or Bushinengue, meaning black people of the forest) are the descendants of enslaved Africans that escaped from the plantations and settled in the inland of Suriname (Dutch Guiana) and French Guiana. The Surinamese Maroon culture is one of the best-preserved pieces of cultural heritage outside of Africa. Colonial warfare, land grabs, natural disasters and migration have marked Maroon history. In Suriname six Maroon groups — or tribes — can be distinguished from each other.

Demographics
There are six major groups of Surinamese Maroons, that settled along different river banks:

 Aluku (or Boni) at the Commewijne River later Marowijne River,
 Kwinti at the Coppename River, 
 Matawai at the Saramacca River,
 Ndyuka (or Aukan) at the Marowijne and Commewijne Rivers
 Paamaka (Paramaccan) at the Marowijne River
 Saamaka (Saramaccan) at the Suriname River

Distribution

Language
The sources of the Surinamese Maroon vocabulary are the English language, Portuguese, some Dutch and a variety of African languages. Between 5% and 20% of the vocabulary is of African origin. Its phonology is closest to that of African languages. The Surinamese Maroons have developed a system of meaning-distinctive intonation, as is common in Africa.

Religion
The traditional Surinamese Maroon religion is called Winti. It is a syncretization of different African religious beliefs and practices brought in mainly by Akan and Fon slaves. Winti is typical for Suriname, where it originated. The religion has a pantheon of spirits called Winti. Ancestor veneration is central. It has no written sources, nor a central authority. Practising Winti was forbidden by law for nearly hundred years. Since the 1970s, many Maroons have moved to urban areas and have become evangelical. After the turn of the millennium Winti gained momentum. It is becoming more popular, especially in the Maroon diaspora.

See also 
Slavery in Suriname

References

Further reading 
 Willem F. Van Lier, Notes sur la vie spirituelle et sociale des Djuka (Noirs réfugiés Auca) au Surinam, trad., Universiteit Leiden, 1939   
 Diane Vernon, Les représentations du corps chez les Noirs Marrons Ndjuka du Surinam et de la Guyane française, ORSTOM, 1992 
 Michel Bindault, Lexique français-bushi-nenge et bushi-nenge-français, Grand-Santi, 1993.
 Richard Price, Les premiers temps : la conception de l'histoire des Marrons saramaka, trad., Seuil, 1994.
 Desmo Betian, Wemo Betain, Anya Cockle, Parlons saramaka, L'Harmattan, 2000.
 Laurence Goury, Le ndyuka : une langue créole du Surinam et de Guyane française, L'Harmattan, 2003.
 Napi Tutu : l'enfant, la flûte et le diable, conte aluku, CRDP de Guyane, 2003.
 Laurence Goury, Grammaire du nengee : introduction aux langues aluku, ndyuka et pamaka, IRD, 2003.
 Les leçons d'Ananshi l'araignée, conte bushinengué, SCEREN-CRDP de Guyane, 2007.
 Élisabeth Godon, Les enfants du fleuve. Les écoles du fleuve en Guyane française : le parcours d'une psy, L'Harmattan, 2008.

History of Suriname
Ethnic groups in Suriname
Maroons (people)